Map of places in East Dunbartonshire compiled from this list
See the list of places in Scotland for places in other counties.

This List of places in East Dunbartonshire is a list of links for any town, village and hamlet in the East Dunbartonshire council area of Scotland.

A
Auchenhowie
Auchinairn
Auchinreoch

B
Baldernock 
Balgrochan
Balgrochan  
Bardowie
Barnellan
Barraston
Birdston
Bishopbriggs
Blairskaith

C
Cadder
Clachan of Campsie
Craigton

D
Dougalston

H
Haughhead 
 Huntershill Village

K
Kilmardinny
Kirkintilloch

L
Lennoxtown 
Lenzie

M
Milngavie,  
Milton of Campsie

T
Torrance
Twechar

W
Waterside

See also
List of places in Scotland

East Dunbartonshire
Geography of East Dunbartonshire

Lists of places in Scotland
Populated places in Scotland